Francis Lee Johnson (August 5, 1910 – April 18, 1997) was an American basketball player who competed in the 1936 Summer Olympics in Berlin.

He was part of the American basketball team, which won the gold medal. He played two matches including the final.

He played college basketball at Municipal University of Wichita (now known as Wichita State University) where his brother Gene was head coach from 1928–1933.

References

External links
 
 
 
 

1910 births
1997 deaths
Amateur Athletic Union men's basketball players
American men's basketball players
Basketball players at the 1936 Summer Olympics
Basketball players from Kansas
Medalists at the 1936 Summer Olympics
Olympic gold medalists for the United States in basketball
United States men's national basketball team players
Wichita State Shockers football players
Wichita State Shockers men's basketball players